Nzime (Koonzime) is a Bantu language of Cameroon, spoken by the Nzime and Dwe'e (Bajwe'e) people. Maho (2009) lists these as two languages.

It is closely related to Mpo.

Demographics
Koonzime is spoken in most of the southern part of the Haut-Nyong region (Eastern Region). The Nzime are located mainly around and east of Lomié, and the closely related Njem in Ngoïla commune.

Koonzime is spoken by about 30,000 speakers.

References

 
Makaa-Njem languages
Languages of Cameroon